The 2022 Tormenta FC season was  the club's seventh season of existence, and their fourth season as a professional club, all of which have been spent in the third tier of American soccer in USL League One. Tormenta FC enter this season following an 11th-place finish the previous season. This will be the club's first season in their new stadium, Optim Health System Field, after spending previous seasons at Eagle Field on the campus of Georgia Southern University.

Club

Roster

Competitions

Exhibitions

USL League One

Standings

Match results

USL League One playoffs

U.S. Open Cup

References

Tormenta FC seasons
Tormenta FC
Tormenta FC
Tormenta FC